Faro National Park is a national park in Cameroon's North Province. It is home to cheetahs, black rhinoceros, elephants, and is known for its colonies of hippopotamuses.

The park is enclosed between two large sandy, perennial rivers, the Faro on the north-east and the Déo along the western side, which flows into the Faro in the extreme north.

See also

List of national parks of Cameroon
Communes of Cameroon

References

National parks of Cameroon
North Region (Cameroon)
Northern Congolian forest–savanna mosaic